Sure Love may refer to:
 Sure Love (album), a 1992 album by Hal Ketchum
 Sure Love (Hal Ketchum song)
 Sure Love (Jarryd James song)